Omar Al-Khodari (born August 26, 1990) is a Saudi football player who plays as a striker. He played in the Pro League for Al-Ittihad.

Honours
Al-Fateh SC
Saudi Professional League: 2012–13
Saudi Super Cup: 2013

References

External links 
 

1990 births
Living people
Saudi Arabian footballers
Ittihad FC players
Al-Fateh SC players
Al-Riyadh SC players
Al-Fayha FC players
Al-Nahda Club (Saudi Arabia) players
Saudi First Division League players
Saudi Professional League players
Association football forwards